AirAsia X (previously known as FlyAsianXpress Sdn. Bhd.), is a long-haul budget airline based in Malaysia, and a sister company of AirAsia. It commenced operations on 2 November 2007 with its first service flown from Kuala Lumpur International Airport, Malaysia, to Gold Coast Airport in Australia. AirAsia X flies to destinations within Asia, Australia, and the United States of America. The airline operates a fleet of 15 Airbus A330-300 aircraft.

AirAsia X is the medium and long-haul operation of the brand AirAsia, which is Asia's largest low-cost carrier.

History
On 17 May 2007, Tony Fernandes announced plans to commence flights from Malaysia to Australia. Fernandes said he would be avoiding Sydney Airport due to its high fees. Instead the airline would concentrate on cheaper alternatives such as Avalon (Melbourne), Newcastle and Adelaide. Sustained fares were predicted to be around MYR 800 (A$285) for a return fare, plus taxes. Interest was also expressed in using Gold Coast Airport as another Australian destination. Fernandes named the airline AirAsia X, citing inspiration from Yoshiki, leader of the Japanese rock band X Japan.

Several major developments were announced on 10 August 2007. AirAsia X announced its first route from Kuala Lumpur to the Gold Coast, with one way fares to begin at MYR 50 (A$17) excluding taxes and charges, with average return prices to be approximately MYR1,800 (A$598), inclusive of taxes and charges.

The airline also announced that Richard Branson of the Virgin Group would take a 20% share in the airline to help kick-start its long haul operations and to finance its aircraft purchases. Branson also forecast a strong possibility of future, formal links between Virgin Blue and AirAsia X, including codeshare agreements and Loyalty programs.

The first AirAsia X aircraft arrived at Kuala Lumpur International Airport on 15 September 2007. It was named "Semangat Sir Freddie" (English: "Spirit of Sir Freddie") after the pioneer and founder of the low-cost model; the late, Sir Freddie Laker of Skytrain.

FlyAsianXpress

FlyAsianXpress (FAX) was an airline based in East Malaysia. It operated services on some of the smaller routes dropped by national carrier Malaysia Airlines. Its routes have since been taken over by MASwings.

FAX was privately owned by Kamarudin Meranun, Raja Razali, Raja Azmi and Tony Fernandes. The airline was subcontracted by AirAsia to operate several domestic services following the withdrawal of Malaysia Airlines from rural air service routes within East Malaysia. Its maiden flight was on 1 August 2006, despite being delayed for 50 minutes by bad weather. FAX was not a low-cost carrier, but it incorporated some of AirAsia's practices to reduce cost. Namely; internet and phone bookings, as well as ticketless check-in systems.

Within days of operation it was subject to a flood of criticisms from commuters, civil servants, and people working in the tourism industry. Critics argued that the new turboprop service provided by FAX should not be more expensive than the rural air service previously operated by Malaysia Airlines, as FAX was subsidised by the Malaysian Government. As well as cost, the airline was criticised for poor service, such as sudden flight cancellations without notice. The CEO of Sarawak Tourism Board also stated that disruptions to cargo supply flights to the interior, caused tourists to take their own food rations, rather than rely upon the air cargo supplies of food and fuel. FAX released a new flight timetable citing the sudden need for heavy maintenance on its Fokker 50 fleet as the trigger for severe disruption to its schedules.

On 11 April 2007, Tony Fernandes, CEO of the parent company of FAX (AirAsia), publicised details of a handover offer of FAX's rural routes, to Firefly, a subsidiary airline of Malaysia Airlines. He described it as "the logical thing to do", as Firefly can be the only national company operating turboprop aircraft. On 26 April 2007, the government announced Malaysia Airlines would take over the operation of rural air services from FAX, and gave assurance that any financial loss would be borne by the government. Malaysia Airlines announced the take over of FAX destinations beginning on 1 October 2007. Malaysia Airlines would operate these routes through a new subsidiary, MASwings.

With FAX rural air services replaced by MASwings, the corporate name was changed from FlyAsianXpress Sdn. Bhd. to AirAsia X Sdn. Bhd. with this, the airlines focus switched to a new market, low cost, long haul flights.

Corporate affairs

The head office and registered office is at the RedQ facility on the property of Kuala Lumpur International Airport Terminal 2 in Sepang, Selangor.

The head office was previously located at the LCC Terminal at KLIA, while the registered office was on Level 12 of the Menara Prima Tower B in Petaling Jaya, Selangor. The airline planned to move its head office to a new , RM140mil facility constructed at klia2. Until the new head office opens, the airline's head office will remain at LCCT. The new klia2 head office was scheduled to open in the end of 2015. It is scheduled to hold about 2,000 AirAsia and AirAsia X employees. Aireen Omar, the AirAsia Country CEO of Malaysia, stated that the headquarters needed to be redesigned because in the klia2 plans the location of the control tower had been changed. Construction on the facility was scheduled to begin in July 2014. Malaysia Airports Holdings is leasing the land that will be occupied by the headquarters. Filipina AirAsia X flight attendant January Ann Baysa gave the building the name "RedQuarters" or "RedQ", and its groundbreaking ceremony was held in November 2014.

AirAsia X claims to have one of the lowest operating costs of any long-haul airline around the world, with a Cost per Available Seat-Kilometre (CASK) of US$0.0351 in 2015, or US$0.0240 excluding fuel costs (allowing them to undercut conventional long-haul fares by between 30 and 50%). To reduce costs, they also co-ordinate many aspects of their operation together with larger affiliate AirAsia (Asia's largest low-cost carrier), such as staff requirements, fuel hedging, marketing and computer systems, which allows them to take advantage of economies of scale that would not be normally available to an airline of their size.

Shareholders
The entrance of two new major investors has given the company financial aid for future expansion plans.

As of 14 February 2008, 48% of AirAsia X is owned by Aero Ventures; a venture of Tony Fernandes and other prominent Malaysians, as well as Air Canada's Robert Milton. Virgin Group own 16% and a further 16% is owned by AirAsia. Bahrain-based Manara Consortium, and Japan-based Orix Corp have taken a 20% stake in AirAsia X for RM250 million.

AirAsia X was listed on the Bursa Malaysia (the Kuala Lumpur Stock Exchange) on 10 July 2013, with the shares offered to individual and institutional investors at MYR1.25 (approx. US$0.39) per share. The float raised MYR988 million (US$310 million, as of 2013 exchange rates) and valued the company at MYR3 billion (US$940 million). Shares initially performed poorly, closing unchanged on the first day of trading to post, according to Bloomberg, the "second-worst trading debut in Malaysia" that year. As of 10 October 2016, shares of AirAsia X Berhad were trading at MYR0.39, giving the company a market value of MYR1.62 billion (US$390 million at 2016 exchange rates).

According to the Financial Times, as of June 2015, the largest shareholder of AirAsia X Berhad was Tune Group (a private investment vehicle owned by Tony Fernandes and Kamarudin Meranun), which owns a 17.8% stake. AirAsia Berhad (which Tune owns 19.1% of) holds a further 13.8% of AirAsia X while Tony Fernandes and Kamarudin Meranun also hold personal stakes, of 2.1% and 8.1% respectively. Lim Kiann Onn, a founding director and shareholder of other Tune Group businesses such as Tune Money and Tune Hotels, is the 4th largest shareholder, with 4.47% of the company.

Affiliate airlines

Indonesia AirAsia X

Indonesia AirAsia X is a joint venture of AirAsia X. It serves Indonesia AirAsia's regularly scheduled long haul international flights from Bali's Ngurah Rai International Airport. Indonesia AirAsia X was planned to launch its first destination to Melbourne on 26 December 2014 but was delayed till 18 March 2015 due to delays in route approval from Australian authority. Instead, Taipei became Indonesia AirAsia X first destination by launching service on 30 January 2015.

In November 2018, the airline announced that it will be ceasing scheduled operations from January 2019, it however it will be operating non-scheduled operations from then.

Thai AirAsia X

Thai AirAsia X is a joint venture of AirAsia X in Thailand. Thai AirAsia X is Thailand's first long-haul low-cost airline and began operation since its maiden service from Bangkok to Incheon, South Korea on 17 June 2014 and followed by Tokyo Narita and Osaka Kansai in Japan.

Destinations

, AirAsia X operates or has previously operated to the following destinations:

Future expansion
In June 2011, the airline received government approval to begin service to six cities: Beijing, Shanghai, Osaka, Jeddah, Istanbul, and Surat.

AirAsia X also plans to fly to Xi'an, Wuhan and Shenyang in the People's Republic of China. In 2009, the airline announced that it planned to serve Africa. AirAsia X also announced plans to expand to Japan and further into Australia.

On 12 January 2012, AirAsia X withdrew services to Delhi, Mumbai, London and Paris, citing high fuel prices, "exorbitant" taxes, and weak travel demand. The airline also announced that it would fly from Kuala Lumpur to Sydney effective 1 April 2012. Shortly after the announcement of the Sydney launch, the airline is also looking to serve Adelaide as the airline continues to expand in Australia. The airline also withdrew its service to Christchurch, New Zealand on 31 May 2012 after only a year of launching service. At the same time, the airline announced that it would increase services to Perth and Taipei from June 2012. On 22 June 2012, the airline launched service to Beijing, its third Chinese destination and at the same time terminated service to Tianjin. AirAsia X also suspended service to Abu Dhabi many years prior due to unprofitability.

On 8 October 2012, AirAsia X announced with seven days notice that it would withdraw service to Tehran citing "challenging economic and business conditions", which drew criticism amidst allegations of poor service and deceptive practices.

In July 2013, AirAsia X executed an IPO on the Bursa Malaysia, raising $310 million. The international law firm of Pillsbury Winthrop Shaw Pittman advised on the transaction. The capital was to be used to further expand routes, especially after obtaining Thai authorities' approval for an air operator's certificate to operate flights from Bangkok to South Korea and Japan.

In December 2013, Tony Fernandes, director of AirAsia X, said that the airline would resume flights to Europe.

On 15 July 2014, CEO Azran Osman-Rani and Airbus President and CEO Fabrice Brégier signed a Memorandum of Understanding (MOU) for 50 A330-900 aircraft at the Farnborough Airshow in the UK. "We have been encouraging Airbus to launch this new version of the A330 for some time now. I am pleased that they are offering this choice and bringing us the aircraft we truly need to develop further our low-cost long haul model. We are 100% sure that the A330neo will be quite unbeatable in its size category and we look forward to enabling more people to fly further more often aboard this great aircraft," said Tan Sri Tony Fernandes, co-founder and Director of AirAsia X.

AirAsia X resumed its Delhi service in early 2016 and returned to New Zealand in March 2016 with the Kuala Lumpur-International to Auckland service, via Gold Coast, but flights were suspended again in February 2019. It resumed services to Tehran on 21 June 2016 with the thrice-weekly Kuala Lumpur-International to Tehran-Imam Khomeini service, but flights were suspended again in April 2018.

It commenced its new route to Sapporo in October 2015 and launched its new route to Honolulu at the end of June 2017 after delays in route approval in 2015. On 9 October 2017, AirAsia X announced the commencement of Jeju, South Korea as a 4 times weekly flight starting on 12 December 2017. On 6 November 2017, it also announced that it would commence direct flights to Jaipur, India on 5 February 2018.

In February 2018, AirAsia X announced that it would stop services between Melbourne Airport and KLIA and initiate services between Avalon Airport and KLIA. Avalon Airport is located 55 km from the CBD of Melbourne and located just 15 km from the CBD of Geelong. In June 2018, it announced services to Avalon Airport would commence on 5 December 2018.

Fleet
, the AirAsia X fleet consists of the following aircraft:

The company equips its Airbus A330-300 jets with a 3-3-3 seat layout in economy class.

Until the mid-2010s, AirAsia X operated Airbus A340-300 jets, capable of ultra-long haul journeys. These aircraft were used for scheduled trips to the UK, namely London Heathrow, London Stansted and Manchester Airport.

It ordered 10 Airbus A350-900s in 2009, but cancelled it in April 2018 due to higher prices on the aircraft. In February 2018, during a business forum in Manila, Fernandes told reporters on the sideline that the airline is looking at the Boeing 787 Dreamliner for fleet expansion. A month later, the decision was made not to proceed with ordering the Boeing aircraft.

In September 2018 it was reported that AirAsia X is evaluating the possibility of using Airbus A321neo and Airbus A321LR aircraft alongside its A330 fleet. By using narrow-body aircraft for its shorter routes (up to 7.9 hours), the airline believes it could achieve variable cost savings of up to 16%, and fixed cost savings of up to 5%.

In March 2020, AirAsia X announced the delay of delivery of the airline's Airbus A330-900 aircraft indefinitely due to the COVID-19 pandemic.

Former fleet

 Airbus A340-300 - AirAsia X operated 2 of the Airbus A340-300 before one of them being scrapped and the other being sold to Lufthansa Technik. Both left the fleet in 2015 after 8 years of operations.

Incidents and accidents
On 25 June 2017, AirAsia X Flight 237, an Airbus A330-300 registered 9M-XXE and carrying 359 people on board, had to divert back to Perth whilst en route to Kuala Lumpur, the aircraft was southwest of Learmonth, Western Australia, when the engine on the left had suffered a blade fracture. It caused severe damage in the engine core and had caused severe vibrations. The pilots had to shut down the engine and turned around back to Perth; no passengers or crew were injured.
On 3 July 2017, AirAsia X Flight 207, an Airbus A330-300 registered 9M-XXT carrying 345 passengers and 14 crew on board, diverted to Brisbane whilst en route from Gold Coast to Kuala Lumpur. The aircraft suffered a bird strike on the right hand engine. Two dead birds were retrieved from the engine and the aircraft sustained minor damage.

See also

 AirAsia
 List of airlines of Malaysia
 Transport in Malaysia

References

External links

 Official website

2007 establishments in Malaysia
Low-cost carriers
AirAsia
Airlines of Malaysia
Airlines established in 2007
Malaysian companies established in 2007
Malaysian brands
Tune Group
Companies listed on Bursa Malaysia
Companies based in Sepang